Penion crawfordi is an extinct species of marine snail or whelk, belonging to the true whelk family Buccinidae.

Description
Penion crawfordi is a large, extinct species of Penion siphon whelk. Shells of P. crawfordi have spine-like, dorso-ventrally compressed nodules on the shell spire.

Distribution
Fossils of Penion crawfordi are found in northern South Island and southern North Island in New Zealand.

References

External links

 Revised descriptions of New Zealand Cenozoic Mollusca from Beu and Maxwell (1990): Penion crawfordi (Hutton, 1873)
 International Fossil Shell Museum: New Zealand Miocene

Buccinidae
Gastropods of New Zealand
Extinct animals of New Zealand
Gastropods described in 1873